Alcedar is a commune in Șoldănești District, Moldova. It is composed of three villages: Alcedar,  Curătura and Odaia.

Notable people
 Teodor Herța

References

Communes of Șoldănești District
Tivertsi